Bellis habarena is a type of daisy in the genus Bellis. This species of daisy has large amounts of red tipped petals that crowd the yellow disk floret, making the daisy look like a cone-shaped pom-pom that has a white center and a red outer layer.

References

habanera